Events during the year 1961 in Northern Ireland.

Incumbents
 Governor - 	The Lord Wakehurst 
 Prime Minister - Basil Brooke

Events
4 March -  is commissioned as the Indian Navy's first aircraft carrier in Belfast, having been completed here by Harland and Wolff.
May - The last passenger liner completed by Harland and Wolff in Belfast, is delivered to her owners, P&O.
6 May - Northern Ireland international wing-half Danny Blanchflower captains Tottenham Hotspur F.C. to the double of the Football League First Division title and FA Cup in England - the first team in 64 years to achieve this feat.
8 August - Queen Elizabeth II and her husband Prince Philip arrive at Carrickfergus on HMY Britannia to begin a 2-day royal visit to Northern Ireland.
20 December - The last legal execution in Ireland occurs in Belfast - it is of Robert McGladdery for murder.

Arts and literature

Sport

Football
Irish League
Winners: Linfield

Irish Cup
Winners: Glenavon 5 - 1 Linfield

Births
15 January - Damian O'Neill, guitarist.
6 June - Bob Gilmore, musicologist and musician.
15 June - Dave McAuley, boxer.
10 September - Ian Stewart, footballer.
4 November - Nigel Worthington, footballer, football manager and manager of Northern Ireland national football team.
26 December - John Lynch, actor.
Maureen Boyle, poet.
Owen McCafferty, playwright.
Eoin McNamee, novelist and screenwriter.
Marcas Ó Murchú, traditional flute player.
Glenn Patterson, writer.

Deaths
18 January - Joseph Connolly, Fianna Fáil politician (born 1885).
25 September - James Crichton, soldier, recipient of the Victoria Cross for gallantry in 1918 at Crèvecœur, France (born 1879).
8 December - Seamus Robinson, member of Irish Volunteers and Irish Republican Army (born 1890).
20 December - Robert McGladdery, murderer and last person to be executed in Northern Ireland.

See also
1961 in Scotland
1961 in Wales

References